Ice Cold Cash is a Canadian game show that ran from February 10 to June 6, 2012 for 28 episodes on Food Network.

Overview
Host Joseph Motiki dresses as an ice cream seller and pedals around in an ice cream cart.  The general public approaches the cart as if to get ice cream or a frozen treat, only to be told he has nothing in stock. Motiki explains that he only has cash and that there are ten questions that may be food, drink, or culinary related.  The first question is for $10 and every question thereafter doubles.  When contestants reach $160, they can't leave with anything less.

There were two segments in the show.  The first one was where people were given a kitchen gadget and asked if they knew what the kitchen gadget was. The correct response would get them $20.  A second segment is a game of charades where one person acts out the item given to them to by Motiki.

The ice cream cart was built by Great Lake Scenic Studios.

Episodes

References

External links

2012 Canadian television series debuts
2012 Canadian television series endings
Food Network (Canadian TV channel) original programming